Cancer and Metastasis Reviews is a quarterly peer-reviewed medical review journal covering oncology and the development of new cancer treatments. It was established in 1982 and is published by Springer Science+Business Media. The editors-in-chief are Kenneth V. Honn (Wayne State University School of Medicine) and Avraham Raz (Barbara Ann Karmanos Cancer Institute). According to the Journal Citation Reports, the journal has a 2020 impact factor of 9.264.

References

External links

Publications established in 1982
Quarterly journals
Oncology journals
English-language journals
Springer Science+Business Media academic journals
Review journals